Moe River may refer to:

Moe River (Australia), Victoria, Australia
Moe River (rivière aux Saumons), Estrie, Quebec, Canada